The 2004 Transnistrian census was organized in Transnistria at roughly the same time that Moldova held its own census, which Transnistria refused to participate in out of principle and deference to its September 2, 1990 declaration of independence.

Census results 

Total population (including Bender): 555,347 (percentages below refer to this first figure)

Total population (excluding Bender): 450,337

 Moldovans: 31.9%
 Russians: 30.3%
 Ukrainians: 28.8%
 Bulgarians: 2%
 Poles: 2%
 Gagauz: 1.5%
 Jews: 1.3%
 Belarusians: 1%
 Germans: 0.6%
 Others: 0.5%

Preliminary data, as shown here, was released forty days after the completion of the census. Final and more detailed results were released with a delay of nearly two years.

Compared with the 1989 census, the population decreased by 18% due to war, natural decrease and economically motivated emigration.

The cost of the census was estimated US$550 thousand.

See also 
 1989 Transnistrian census
 2015 Transnistrian census
 Demographic history of Transnistria
 2004 Moldovan census

References

External links 
 2004 census info

Censuses in Transnistria
Transnistria
2004 in Transnistria
Transnistria